Rupert Mackay Tyson Matthews (19 July 1888 – 21 February 1966) was an Australian rules footballer who played with University in the Victorian Football League (VFL) between 1909 and 1911.

He later served in World War I.

References

External links 

University Football Club players
Australian rules footballers from Victoria (Australia)
People educated at Wesley College (Victoria)
Australian military personnel of World War I
1888 births
1966 deaths
Australian rules footballers from New South Wales